The Thousandth Anniversary of Islam Mosque or The Anniversary Mosque (Russian: Мечеть 1000-летия принятия Ислама, Мечеть Юбилейная – Mechet’ 1000-letiya prinyatiya Islama, Mechet’ Yubileynaya) was built in Kazan, Tatarstan, Russia to commemorate the thousandth anniversary of the conversion of the Volga Bulgars in to Islam in 922. The part where the mosque was situated was inhabited predominantly by the Russian community.

History
Based on a design by Pechnikov from 1914, the mosque was built from 1924 to 1926 with private donations by Muslims. It was the only mosque built in the region during the Soviet period. It was closed in the 1930s as part of the Soviet Unions persecution of Muslims and was only reopened and used by Muslims in 1991.

See also
Islam in Tatarstan
Islam in Russia
List of mosques in Russia
List of mosques in Europe

References
  
 The Thousandth Anniversary of Islam Mosque on "Russian mosques"

Mosques in Kazan
Mosques completed in 1926
1914 architecture
Closed mosques in the Soviet Union
Mosques in Russia
Mosques in Europe
Cultural heritage monuments of federal significance in Tatarstan